Remuched is a double CD released by Berlin-based indie punk band Bonaparte. The first disc (Remuched) contains remixes and a B side from their debut album, Too Much, while the second disc (Blood, Sweat & Würstchen) contains live songs.

Track listing

Remuched
"Killing Time" – 2:01
"Do You Want to Party" (Remuched by Siriusmo) – 3:08
"Ego" (Remuched by Filewile) – 4:47
"Too Much" (Remuched by Housi Housemeister) – 4:32
"Who Took the Pill?" (Remuched by Markus Lange) – 4:53
"Blow It Up" (Remuched by Marvin Suggs) – 4:40
"Lvdngrslvngklls" (Remuched by Rampa) – 7:05
"Wrygdwylife?" (Remuched by One Shot Orchestra) – 5:00
"Who Took the Pill?" (Siriusmo's Reprise) – 1:06
"3 Minutes in the Brain of Bonaparte" (Remuched by Jcll) – 6:11
"Anti Anti" (Remuched by Quinto) – 5:00
"Ego" (Remuched by Jack Tennis) – 4:57
"Blow It Up" (Remuched by Hifi Brown) – 2:57
"Anti Anti" (Aminus' Clap 'til You Die Mix) – 3:14
"Who Took the Pill?" (Remuched by Death of a Cheerleader) – 3:35
"Ego" (Remuched by Zachov) – 4:28
"A Song in ©" (Bonaparte vs. Benfay) – 2:46
"3 Minutes in the Brain of Bonaparte" (Michael Szedlak Mix) – 3:28

Blood, Sweat & Würstchen
"Do You Want to Party" (Live at Admiralspalast Berlin) – 1:55
"Tú me molas" (Live at Festsaal Kreuzberg) – 2:52
"Wrygdwylife?" (Live at Dachstock Bern) – 3:23
"Anti Anti" (Live at Admiralspalast Berlin) – 3:27
"Ego" (Live in the Emperor's Brain) – 3:49
"I Can't Dance" (Live at Dachstock Bern) – 3:18
"Blow It Up" (Live in Carlos' Cellar Dungeon) – 3:22
"A-a-ah" (Live at Mrs. Bonaparte's Château) – 4:29
"Killing Time" (Bosie Sold His Soul to the Devil) – 1:35
Interlude: Xixi's Paranoid Panamanian Fruit Salad – 1:21
"Who Took the Pill?" (Live at Grand Theatre Groningen) – 3:14
"Too Much" (Live in the Bloody Bunny's Costume) – 3:53
Interlude: Le strip de Lulu le Squelette (Leçon 01) – 1:20
"Bienvenido" (Live in Between Caesar's Stripes) – 2:45
"No, I'm Against It!" (Live at Admiralspalast Berlin) – 2:05
"Lvdngrslvngklls" (Live at Cannonman's Helmet) – 4:17
"Gigolo Vagabundo" (Live Somewhere im Grenzbereich) – 4:59
"Anti Anti" (Reprise - Welcome to Madness...) – 2:13
"Blow It Up" (Jazz & Cheese at the Kaiser's House) – 2:43

Notes
The digital download version divided the double CD into two separate releases: Remuched - Remixed (with alternate artwork) and Remuched - Blood, Sweat & Würstchen.
Additional remixes, live tracks and videos were available on http://www.bonaparte.cc/remuched/. The audio tracks found on this website are:
"Blow It Up" (Jazz & Cheese Version) – 2:43
"A-a-ah" (Round Table Knights Remix) – 4:15
"Anti Anti" (Markus Lange Remix) – 5:55
"Blow It Up" (Damien Qwerty Blip It Up Mix) – 3:30
"Ego" (Jack Tennis Vocal Mix) – 5:24
"Ego" (Jacob Suske Old Rmxxl Mas) – 3:42
"I Can't Dance" (Bellwethers I Can't Surf Mix) – 4:09
"Lvdngrslvngklls" (Kg Baltimore Club Mix) – 4:55
"Too Much" (Elektroluk Remix) – 4:03
"Too Much" (Jack Tennis Reggae Mashup) – 3:52
"Too Much" (Markus Lange Remix) – 5:25
"Tú me molas" (Bellwethers Maximum Drama Mix) – 5:30
"Gigolo Vagabundo" (Almost Live) – 4:20
"I Can't Dance" (Almost Live) – 2:48
"Lvdngrslvngklls" (Live) – 3:29
"This War" (Unreleased Early Bonaparte Song Script) – 4:47
"Who Took the Pill?" (Almost Live) – 3:14
A re-recorded version of "This War" was included as a bonus track on the vinyl version of the band's next studio album, My Horse Likes You.
"Anti Anti (Markus Lange Remix)" was subsequently released as "Anti Anti (Markus Lange Dub)" on Anti Anti (Remixes).
"I Can't Dance (Bellwethers I Can't Surf Mix)" and "Tú me molas (Bellwethers Maximum Drama Mix)" were subsequently released in an edited form by New Zealander duo Bellwethers in their debut EP, Cattle Battle. The EP includes two additional remixes of "A-a-ah" and "Gigolo Vagabundo", which are exclusive to that release.

References

2009 remix albums
2009 live albums
Bonaparte (band) albums